Ed Sweeney may refer to:
 Ed Sweeney (baseball) (1888–1947), American Major League Baseball player
 Ed Sweeney (American football) (1949–2017), American college football head coach
 Ed Sweeney (trade unionist) (born 1954), British former trade union leader
 Ed Sweeney, inventor of the Aerocar 2000 and Gemini Hummingbird